Cruises Street (also spelled Cruise's) is a main shopping street of Limerick, Ireland. The street takes its name from Cruises Royal Hotel, the once well known Limerick landmark that stood where Cruises Street is now. Cruise's Hotel opened in 1791 and for over 200 years provided a focal point and an entertainment venue for Limerick people and visitors to the city for generations. The hotel was very well known throughout the country which fronted onto O'Connell Street. Daniel O'Connell, the famous Irish political leader in the 19th Century stayed at the hotel. It also had a presidential suite as Presidents and dignitaries who visited Limerick, regularly stayed there. The Hotel was demolished in 1991 to make way for the new pedestrianised street which opened in late 1992.

The street is relatively plain in layout and starts at a junction off O'Connell Street and runs in parallel to Denmark Street to its north and William Street which is to its south. At the centre of the street is a small square called Quimper Square. The street terminates at Chapel Lane which runs perpendicular to the street and connects to Denmark Street and William Street. A small laneway (Todd's Bow) also connects to William Street and Denmark Street from Quimper Square.

In recent years due to the economic downturn and the increase in shopping facilities in suburban areas of Limerick has resulted in a number of shop closures and a sharp reduction of footfall has occurred on the street which has caused some concern. Although most retail units remain filled, a sizeable number of units on the street remain unoccupied.

Retail Stores on Cruises Street
 Three
 Virgin Media
 McDonald's
 Easons
 Monsoon
 Boots
 River Island
 New Look
 Hickeys
 Wallis
 Ann Summers
 Specsavers
 Thorntons
 Champion Sports
 Argos
 Superdrug
 Mothercare
 Foot Locker
 Costa Coffee
 Trailfinders

Stores no longer trading on Cruises Street
 Next
 Dorothy Perkins
 Evans
 Heirlooms
 Game
 Irish Nationwide
 Vodafone
 HMV
 Early Learning Centre

In 2017 the street celebrated its 25th birthday.

References

Shopping districts and streets in Ireland
Streets in Limerick (city)